William George Morant OBE KPM (30 November 1862 - 19 March 1945) was a British police officer.

Early life
Morant was born in Great Yarmouth in 1862, the son of Alfred Morant, a civil engineer and Town Surveyor of Great Yarmouth. In 1881 he was working as an accountant's assistant.

Early police career

Morant joined the Edinburgh City Police in early 1882 at around the age of 20. There he learnt the basics of police work under the command of Captain Henderson. He spent three and a half years with the Edinburgh City Police before transferring to the Metropolitan Police Service.

Morant served in the Metropolitan Police for a further four and a half years. After this he joined the Reading Borough Police Force, he left the Reading Police after being appointed Chief Constable of the Reigate Borough Police Force.

Senior police career

Morant was appointed Chief Constable of the Reigate Borough Police Force in 1891. He spent three years as Chief Constable of Reigate.
Aged 32, he was appointed Chief Constable of South Shields Borough Police after the resignation and death of its Chief Constable in 1894. 

Morant served as Chief Constable of South Shields Borough Police until October 1902 when he was appointed Chief Constable of Durham Constabulary. He spent the next twenty years as Chief Constable of Durham until retiring in 1922 aged 60.

Honours

 1 January 1920 Officer of the Order of the British Empire 
 Officer of the Order of St John 
 29 December 1921 King's Police Medal
 1887 Queen Victoria Police Jubilee Medal 
 1911 King George V Police Coronation Medal
 Chevalier of the Order of Leopold II

References

1862 births
1945 deaths
Officers in Scottish police forces
Metropolitan Police officers
Officers in English police forces
British Chief Constables